Elizabeth Lyle Robbie Stadium is located in Falcon Heights on the Saint Paul campus of the University of Minnesota. It is primarily used as the home of the Minnesota Golden Gophers women's soccer team. The stadium opened in 1999 and seats 1,000.

The stadium is named after Elizabeth Lyle Robbie, who was the wife of Joe Robbie, former owner of the Miami Dolphins. The Robbie family was originally from South Dakota, but lived a number of years in Minneapolis. Elizabeth was the first female owner of a professional sports franchise in the United States, as she owned the Miami Toros / Minnesota Strikers soccer team in the 1970s and 1980s.

Prior to Robbie Stadium, the school played home games from 1993 to 1998 at the St. Paul Campus Soccer Field, also located in Falcon Heights.

References

External links
 Elizabeth Lyle Robbie Stadium

Buildings and structures in Ramsey County, Minnesota
Minnesota Golden Gophers sports venues
Sports venues in Minneapolis–Saint Paul

Soccer venues in Minnesota